Gerhard Vinken (born 15 April 1961 in Hannover) is a German art historian and a professor at the University of Bamberg.

Life 

Gerhard Vinken studied Art History, Philosophy, and History in Freiburg, Paris and Berlin.  He received his doctorate from the Free University of Berlin in 1995 with a dissertation on French Romanesque architecture.  In 2008 he completed his habilitation in Art History at the University of Bern, Switzerland.  From 1992 to 1994 he served as division head (Gebietsreferent) at the Brandenburg State Architectural Conservation Authority, then moved on to independent work on heritage conservation research projects until 2002.  During this period he was also active as an author and journalist as well as a lecturer at the Ernst Moritz Arndt University in Greifswald, the Free University of Berlin and the Humboldt University in Berlin.

From 2003 to 2006 he was Acting Professor of Art History and Architectural Theory at RWTH Aachen University, then from 2009 to 2012 LOEWE Professor of Interdisciplinary Urban Studies in the Department of Architecture at Darmstadt Technical University. In 2012 he was awarded the Chair in Architectural Conservation / Heritage Sciences at the University of Bamberg, where he directs the Master's Program in Architectural and Heritage Conservation.

His research interests include the theory and history of architectural conservation, architectural and urban history and theory, and spatial theory.

Selected writings

Books

Denkmal – Werte – Bewertung. (ed., together with Birgit Franz), Veröffentlichung des Arbeitskreises Theorie und Lehre der Denkmalpflege e.V., Vol. 23, Holzminden 2014.
Zone Heimat. Altstadt im modernen Städtebau. Munich/Berlin 2010.
Dehio-Handbuch der Deutschen Kunstdenkmäler: Brandenburg. Munich/Berlin 2000,  (ed. by Gerhard Vinken et al.; 2nd ed. 2012, revised by Barbara Rimpel).
Baustruktur und Heiligenkult. Romanische Sakralarchitektur in der Auvergne. Worms 1997.

Essays

Unstillbarer Hunger nach Echtem. Frankfurts neue Altstadt zwischen Rekonstruktion und Themenarchitektur. In: Forum Stadt. Zeitschrift für Stadtgeschichte, Stadtsoziologie, Denkmalpflege und Stadtentwicklung, 40, 2/2013, pp. 119–136.
Reproducing the City? Heritage and Eigenlogik. In: Urban Research & Practice, 5,3, 2012, pp. 325–334.
Freistellen – Rahmen – Zonieren. Räume und Raumtheorie in der Denkmalpflege. In: Suzana Alpsancar, Petra Gehring, Marc Rölli (eds.): Raumprobleme – Philosophische Perspektiven." Munich 2011, pp. 161–180.
Ort und Bahn. Die Räume der modernen Stadt bei Le Corbusier und Rudolf Schwarz. In: Cornelia Jöchner (ed.): Räume der Stadt. Von der Antike bis heute. Berlin 2008, pp. 147–164.
Stadt – Denkmal – Bild. Wider die homogenen Bilder der Heimat. In: Hans-Rudolf Meier (ed.): Dresden. StadtBild und Denkmalpflege. Konstruktion und Rezeption von Bildern der Stadt. Berlin 2008, pp. 162–175.
Ad memoriam patris Benedicti. The Cult of Death and the Art of Memory: The Romanesque Abbey Church of Saint-Benoît-sur-Loire. In: Anselm Haverkamp (ed.): Memory Inc. New York 1996, pp. 15–18.

External links 
 Literature by and about Gerhard Vinken in the catalogue of the German National Library 
 Website of the Chair for Architectural Conservation / Heritage Sciences at Bamberg University
 Gerhard Vinken's page at the Centre for Mediaeval Studies (ZEMAS) at Bamberg University

Living people
1961 births
21st-century German historians
German male non-fiction writers